Justice Conway may refer to:

Albert Conway (1889–1969), justice of the New York Supreme Court, and judge and chief judge of the New York Court of Appeals
William Conway (Arkansas judge) (1805–1852), associate justice of the Arkansas Supreme Court